Founded in 1928 by Vittorio Gui as the Stabile Orchestrale Fiorentina, the Orchestra del Maggio Musicale Fiorentino is an Italian orchestra. It is resident in Florence, at the Teatro Comunale.

Conductors 

 Victor De Sabata
 Antonio Guarnieri
 Gino Marinuzzi
 Tullio Serafin
 Wilhelm Furtwängler
 Bruno Walter
 Otto Klemperer
 Erich Kleiber
 Dimitri Mitropoulos
 Herbert von Karajan
 Leonard Bernstein
 Claudio Abbado
 Carlo Maria Giulini
 Georges Prêtre
 Wolfgang Sawallisch
 Carlos Kleiber
 Georg Solti, 
 Riccardo Chailly, 
 Giuseppe Sinopoli,
 Seiji Ozawa 
 Daniele Gatti

External links
 Official website

Italian orchestras